Fleurieu may refer to the following:

People
Charles Pierre Claret de Fleurieu (1738-1810), French naval officer and politician

Places
Australia
Fleurieu (biogeographic region), a sub-region within the Interim Biogeographic Regionalisation for Australia
Fleurieu Group, an island group in Tasmania consisting of the three main islands - Hunter Island, Robbins Island and Three Hummock Island.
Fleurieu and Kangaroo Island, a government region in South Australia
Fleurieu Peninsula, a peninsula in South Australia
Fleurieu zone, a grouping of five wine regions in South Australia, including the
Southern Fleurieu wine region

Pacific Ocean
Fleurieu's Whirlpool, an earlier name for the North Pacific Gyre

Other 
Fleurieu Art Prize, a landscape art prize associated with the Fleurieu Peninsula in South Australia